Ronneby is a locality and the seat of Ronneby Municipality in Blekinge County, Sweden with 12,029 inhabitants in 2010.

Ronneby is regarded as the heart of "the Garden of Sweden", and in 2005 the park "Brunnsparken" in Ronneby was voted Sweden's most beautiful park. 2006 the park was voted Europe's 4th most beautiful park. The church Heliga Kors kyrka was founded in the 12th century, modified and extended until the 15th century, and badly damaged during Northern Seven Years' War in the 16th century.

History
The city's oldest surviving city privileges are from 1387. The first recorded spelling of the name (around the year 1300) is Rotnæby, "the village upon the roaring (river)", so named because of the rapids on the spot. In the Middle Ages, Ronneby was an important trading and shipping town.

In 1564, Ronneby was the location of a bloody battle during the Northern Seven Years' War between the Swedish and the Danish armies during which the Swedes under King Erik XIV besieged the city, killed many inhabitants (Ronneby Bloodbath) and burnt it to the ground. Erik later reported that "The Water was red from blood of the Danes." The number of victims was heavily exaggerated, for different propagandistic reasons, by both sides.

Following the Treaty of Roskilde in 1658, whereby Blekinge and other southern provinces became Swedish, a navy base was built in Karlskrona – east of Ronneby – which accordingly was granted city rights, while revoking the city rights of Ronneby.

But Ronneby did attract some industries in the 18th century. Besides the industry, it also hosted the Ronneby spa, with water believed to have healing qualities. The park around the spa can still be visited. The first source of chalybeate (ferruginous) water was found in May 1705. But the high period of the spa was in the 19th century.

After a fire in 1864, Ronneby was rebuilt according to a check pattern, which is still the model of today. Ronneby finally regained its city title in 1882. From 1971 it is the seat of the larger Ronneby Municipality.

In the 1970s, the local diving club discovered a shipwreck off the coast of Ronneby that was eventually identified by archaeologists as Gribshunden, a 15th-century Danish warship. The shipwreck is significant as one of the best-preserved wreckages from the early modern period.

Arms

Ronneby did use a coat of arms with the letter R between a star and a crescent at least since 1542. In 1882, the arms were redesigned, with the R substituted with the Ronnebyå River. The same coat of arms is used today by the municipality.

Images

Education
 Knut Hahn Secondary School, a school aimed primarily at students in their late teens. It was completely renovated in 2004, at a cost of well over 100 million SEK (roughly US$16 million). It is funded and run by the Ronneby Municipality. It features most of the national programmes, teaching arts, science, industrial work and economics among many other subjects. It has about 700 students. 
Blekinge Institute of Technology (moved to Karlskrona in August 2010)

Ronneby also has many schools for lower ages, all run by the municipality save for a secondary school which is run by a company, called Thoren Framtid.

Climate
Ronneby has an oceanic climate (Cfb), similar to most of Southern Sweden. The climate is very similar to neighbouring city Karlshamn, but has a somewhat higher rainfall and cooler nights throughout the year at the site located inside the premises of the local airport.

Sports
These are two of the more prominent sports clubs in Ronneby:
Ronneby BK, association football
Fredriksbergs BK, bandy

Notable residents
 Josefina Wettergrund (1830-1903), writer
 Messiah Marcolin, vocalist best known for his work in the Swedish doom metal band Candlemass

See also
Ronneby, Minnesota

References

External links 

Collection of Ronneby links

Municipal seats of Blekinge County
Swedish municipal seats
Populated places in Ronneby Municipality
Market towns in Sweden